The Melbourne, Brunswick & Coburg Tramway Trust was a tram operator in Melbourne, Australia

History
The Melbourne, Brunswick & Coburg Tramway Trust (MBCTT) was established in 1914 by the municipalities of Melbourne, Brunswick and Coburg. It was to build and operate an electric tramway within the areas of the municipalities and convert the Sydney Road horse tramway to electric traction.

The line stated from the corner of Queensbury and Swanston Streets in North Melbourne proceeding north via Swanston, Elgin and Lygon Streets to Albion Street and along Holmes Road to a junction at the corner of Moreland Road. The mainline proceeded west along Moreland Road to Sydney Road and north as far as Bakers Road, whilst a branch line continued north along Nicholson Street to Bell Street. It opened in stages in 1916.

The MBCTT was taken over by the Melbourne & Metropolitan Tramways Board (M&MTB) on 2 February 1920. The MBCTT lines remain open today being served by Yarra Trams routes 1, 6 and 19.

Rolling stock
The initial rolling stock consisted of 12 single truck California cars built by Duncan & Fraser of Adelaide. All passed to the M&MTB as the S class. A further six were on order when the MBCTT was taken over and delivered directly to the M&MTB.

Another six cars were ordered in 1916 from Duncan & Fraser. These six cars differed in having a long divided saloon and no motormen’s bulkheads. All passed to the M&MTB as the T class.

Depot
The depot and offices were constructed near the corner of Moreland Road and Nicholson Street, Coburg. Trams last used it in 1952, with it then being used by maintenance crews until 2002. It was demolished in 2007.

References

Trams in Melbourne
Transport companies established in 1914
Transport companies disestablished in 1920
1914 establishments in Australia
1920 disestablishments in Australia
1920 mergers and acquisitions